Deobrat Mishra (born 4 June 1976) is an Indian sitarist. He is an exponent of the Benares Gharana school of Indian classical music. He plays Banarasi Thumri on sitar.

Early life and education
Deobrat Mishra was born in Varanasi, India to the sitar player Shivnath Mishra. He received a master's degree in sitar from the Prayag Sangit Samiti in Allahabad.He has been traveling around the world with his unique style of sitar, giving concerts and workshops at packed venues.

Performance with International Musicians Like
Roberto Olzer Piano-Italy, Roger Hanschel (Saxophone-Germany), Leslie Mandoki Drums-Germany/Hungary,Al Di Meola Guitar-USA, Mike Stern  Guitar-USA,Tony Carey Vocals-USA, Randy Brecker Trumpet Player-USA, Nick Van Eede English Musician,Christian Burchard  Music Composer-Germany, Marja Burchard Instrumentalists- Germany.

Discography
 Soul of Benares (2013) – Bihaan Music
 India meets Europe (2012) - Relaxation 2000 Luxembourg
 Sitar Jugalbandi (2011) - Bihaan Music
 Sound of Meditation (2011)- Bihaan Music
 Gandharva Indoeuropean Music Ensemble (2009) - Amiata Records, Italy
 Milan (2009) - Bihaan Music
 Soul of Sitar (2007) - T-Series
 Emotions of Sitar (2007)- T-Series
 Sound of Sitar (2006) - T-Series
 Sitar Jugalbandi (2006) - T-Series
 Cororchestra del Piemonte (2005) - La Stampa, Italy
 Raga Cycle (2004) - Soundings of the planet, USA
 Trio Benares (2016) - Jazz Sick-Germany

References

1976 births
Living people